Jaron Samuel Blossomgame (born September 16, 1993) is an American professional basketball player for AS Monaco of the LNB Pro A and the Euroleague. Blossomgame played college basketball for Clemson University and was selected in the second round of the 2017 NBA draft by the San Antonio Spurs.

High school career
Blossomgame attended Chattahoochee High School in Johns Creek, Georgia. He played high school basketball for the Cougars under Head Coach Kacey Martin and Assistants Mason Singletary and Lorenzo Withright. After his junior season, he earned first-team all-region and second-team all-state honors after averaging 24 points and 8.8 rebounds per game. As a senior, Blossomgame helped Chattahoochee end the season with a 25–5 record, as his team advanced all the way to the elite 8 before losing to Southwest Dekalb. He joined the Georgia Stars of the Amateur Athletic Union (AAU) in 2011 and led his team with 15.7 points per game. However, that year, Blossomgame broke his leg while trying to dunk with his trainer. His bone protruded from his left leg at the time. After the injury, he expected to wear a cast for the following six to eight weeks.

College career
Blossomgame chose Clemson over VCU, Wichita State, Tennessee Tech and Gardner-Webb. He elected to redshirt the 2012–13 season due to the broken leg suffered in AAU.

After two seasons of steadily-improving production, Blossomgame enjoyed a breakout junior season in 2015–16. Blossomgame averaged 18.7 points and 6.7 rebounds per game and became the 13th Clemson player to be named first-team All-Atlantic Coast Conference (ACC). He was also named the conference's Most Improved Player for the season. Following the season, Blossomgame declared his eligibility for the 2016 NBA draft, and was invited to the NBA Draft Combine. Ultimately, he chose to return to Clemson for his senior season.

Blossomgame was named to the preseason All-ACC team and was named a preseason All-American by several publications. Blossomgame averaged 17.7 points and 6.3 rebounds and led the Tigers to the 2017 National Invitation Tournament, earning third-team All-ACC honors. He was also a finalist for the Senior CLASS Award, earning second-team senior All-American honors. After his last year at Clemson ended, Blossomgame was invited to his second straight NBA Draft Combine event, becoming one of the first players to ever get invited to the event multiple times in different years.

Professional career

Austin Spurs (2017–2018)
Blossomgame was drafted with the 59th pick in the 2017 NBA draft by the San Antonio Spurs. Blossomgame was later included in the 2017 NBA Summer League roster. In November 2017, Blossomgame joined the Austin Spurs of the NBA G League. In April 2018, he helped Austin win the 2017–18 G League championship. He was subsequently named in the All-NBA G League Third Team.

On September 24, 2018, Blossomgame was included in the training camp roster for the San Antonio Spurs, but was later waived by the Spurs on October 8 after appearing in three preseason games. On October 22, 2018, Blossomgame was included in the training camp roster of the Austin Spurs, and on October 31, Blossomgame was included in Austin's opening night roster.

Canton Charge (2018)
On November 19, 2018, Canton Charge announced that they had acquired Blossomgame from Austin Spurs in exchange for the returning right of John Holland.

Cleveland Cavaliers (2018–2019) 
After ten games in the G League (in which he averaged 20.9 points and 7.5 rebounds per game), Blossomgame was signed by the Cleveland Cavaliers to a two-way contract with the Charge. On December 5, 2018, Blossomgame made his debut in NBA, coming off the bench in a 105–129 loss to the Golden State Warriors with a rebound. Five days later on December 10, 2018, Blossomgame had his first double-double, coming off the bench in a 92–108 loss to the Milwaukee Bucks with eleven points, ten rebounds, two assists and a block. On June 23, 2019, Blossomgame become an unrestricted free agent.

Rio Grande Valley Vipers (2019–2020)
On September 27, 2019, Blossomgame signed a training camp contract with the Houston Rockets. Blossomgame was released by the Houston Rockets on October 18. On October 24, the Rio Grande Valley Vipers acquired Blossomgame’s rights in exchange for Gary Payton II. Blossomgame was later included in the training camp roster of the Rio Grande Valley Vipers.

Windy City Bulls (2020)
On February 1, 2020, the Rio Grande Valley Vipers announced that they had traded Blossomgame to the Windy City Bulls with the returning rights to Jonathan Gibson and Kyle Davis in a three-team trade in acquiring Jarell Martin from the Stockton Kings, who received a 1st round draft pick of 2020 NBA G League Draft and the returning right to Charles Cooke from the Bulls.

Ironi Nahariya (2020–2021)
On August 13, 2020, the Ironi Nahariya announced that they had signed Blossomgame.

ratiopharm Ulm (2021–2022)
On July 21, 2021, Blossomgame signed with ratiopharm Ulm in Germany.

AS Monaco Basket (2022–present)
On July 19, 2022, he has signed with AS Monaco Basket of the LNB Pro A.

Career statistics

NBA

Regular season

|-
| style="text-align:left;"| 
| style="text-align:left;"| Cleveland
| 27 || 4 || 16.3 || .443 || .256 || .769 || 3.6 || .5 || .3 || .3 || 4.2
|- class="sortbottom"
| style="text-align:center;" colspan="2"| Career
| 27 || 4 || 16.3 || .443 || .256 || .769 || 3.6 || .5 || .3 || .3 || 4.2

Basketball-Bundesliga

Regular season

|-
| style="text-align:left;"| 2021–22
| style="text-align:left;"| Ulm
| 18 || 18 || 27.4 || .547 || .355 || .673 || 5.2 || .8 || .7 || .7 || 13.9

Source: basketball-stats.de (Date: 29. January 2022)

References

External links
Clemson Tigers bio

1993 births
Living people
21st-century African-American sportspeople
African-American basketball players
American men's basketball players
AS Monaco Basket players
Austin Spurs players
Basketball players from Georgia (U.S. state)
Canton Charge players
Clemson Tigers men's basketball players
Cleveland Cavaliers players
People from Alpharetta, Georgia
Power forwards (basketball)
Ratiopharm Ulm players
Rio Grande Valley Vipers players
San Antonio Spurs draft picks
Small forwards
Sportspeople from Fulton County, Georgia
Windy City Bulls players